James Phillip Bugg (26 November 1882 – 7 July 1964) was an Australian politician.

He was born in Somerset in Tasmania. In 1941 he was elected to the Tasmanian House of Assembly as a Labor member for Darwin. He served until his defeat in 1946. Bugg died in Smithton in 1964.

References

1882 births
1964 deaths
Members of the Tasmanian House of Assembly
Australian Labor Party members of the Parliament of Tasmania
20th-century Australian politicians